"Punxsie" is a song by Australian rock duo Divinyls. It was released in late 1988 as the third and final single from their third album Temperamental. Despite the moderate successes of the album's first two singles "Back to the Wall" and "Hey Little Boy", "Punxsie" did not chart in Australia.

Track listing
Australian 7" Single
 "Punxsie" - 4:16
 "Victoria" - 3:33 (song appears on Divinyls debut album Desperate)

References

1988 songs
1988 singles
Divinyls songs
Song recordings produced by Mike Chapman
Songs written by Chrissy Amphlett
Songs written by Mark McEntee
Chrysalis Records singles